Dvipa is a term in Hindu cosmography. The Puranas describe a dvipa to be one of the seven islands or continents that are present on earth, each of them surrounded by an ocean. The same terminology is also used to refer to the seven regions of the cosmos.

In the geocentric model of Hinduism, the seven dvipas are present around Mount Meru, which is present at the centre of Jambudvipa, the term employed for the Indian subcontinent. Dvipa is also sometimes used to refer to the abodes of deities, such as Manidvipa.

Etymology 
The word dvipa is a portmanteau of the Sanskrit words dvī (two) and apa (water), meaning "having water on two sides". It is cognate with the Young Avestan 'duuaēpa', which means the same.

Description 

According to the Matsya Purana and the Bhagavata Purana, the world is divided into seven dvipas, termed as the sapta-dvīpa (the seven islands). The Mahabharata names the following as the seven islands of the world:

The British author Benjamin Walker offers the following description of the dvipas: 

Beneath the celestial regions, the earth is arranged in these seven concentric rings of island continents. 

 Jambudvipa is the innermost of these island continents, shaped like a disc. The earth rests upon the head of Shesha, the cosmic serpent, who is himself supported by the tortoise named Akupara, who is supported by the Ashtadiggajas, the eight celestial elephants that stand on the shell of Brahmanda.
 Plaksha is the second of the ring-shaped continents, surrounded by a sea of sugarcane juice.
 Shalmala is the third of the ring-shaped continents, surrounded by a sea of wine.
 Kusha is the fourth of the ring-shaped continents, surrounded by a sea of clarified butter (ghee).
 Krauncha is the fifth of the ring-shaped continents, surrounded by a sea of curds.
 Shaka or Shveta is the sixth of the ring-shaped continents, whose shores are surrounded by a sea of milk.
 Pushkara is the seventh of the ring-shaped continents, surrounded by a huge circular sea of freshwater.

Bordering the outermost sea is a land named Lokāloka, which separates the known world from the world of darkness. This realm comprises a range of mountains ten thousand yojanas high. The shell of the cosmic egg known as Brahmanda lies beyond this darkness, cradling all of creation.

Literature

Brahma Purana 
The Brahma Purana describes the sapta-dvīpa as such:

Chaitanya Charitamrita 
The Bengali text Chaitanya Charitamrita describes the concept in the following manner:

See also
Jambudvipa
Manidvipa
Shakadvipa
Kshira Sagara

References

Locations in Hindu mythology
Hindu mythology
Mythological islands